Pingelly was an electoral district of the Legislative Assembly in the Australian state of Western Australia from 1911 to 1950.

The district was located in the Western Australia's Wheatbelt region, based on the town of Pingelly. Though won by the Liberal member for Beverley at its first contest at the 1911 state election, it became a reliable Country Party seat.

Members for Pingelly

Election results

Pingelly